"A Good Thing" is a single by the British band Saint Etienne. Taken from the album Tales from Turnpike House, it was released in the UK by Sanctuary Records . The lead track is co-written by vocalist Sarah Cracknell.

Originally, the 7" single was scheduled to be a limited run of 1000 copies, but due to an error at the record label, all formats were limited to 1000 copies, seriously hindering the single's chart chances.

B-side-wise, the single is a rich mix. The 7" features a co-write between the band's Bob Stanley and Pete Wiggs and David Essex, who featured on the album. The first CD features a cover of the Womack & Womack track "Missing Persons Bureau" (credited to their pseudonym Dr Rue & The Gypsy Wave Banner). The second CD single, meanwhile, features two tracks written for the band's film, What Have You Done Today Mervyn Day?. "Book Norton" is written and sung by sometimes bandmate Debsy Wykes while "Quiet Essex" is written by Bob Stanley and Pete Wiggs.

Only the second single, and third release overall for Sanctuary, this was to be the band's last release for the label.

Track listing

References

Saint Etienne (band) songs
2005 singles
Songs written by Sarah Cracknell
2005 songs
Sanctuary Records singles